Conor Connelly (1975 – 28 March 2020) was an Irish Gaelic footballer who played at club level with Creggs, Michael Glaveys, St Jude's and Ballycumber and at inter-county level with the Roscommon senior football team. He usually lined out as a right wing-forward.

Honours

St Mel's College
Leinster Colleges Senior Football Championship (1): 1994

Roscommon
Connacht Senior Football Championship (1): 2001
Connacht Minor Football Championship (1): 1992

References

1975 births
2020 deaths
Irish solicitors
UCD Gaelic footballers
Michael Glavey's Gaelic footballers
St Jude's Gaelic footballers
Roscommon inter-county Gaelic footballers
Sportspeople from County Roscommon
People educated at St Mel's College